María Paula Bernal (born 13 October 1971) is a Colombian equestrian. She competed in the individual dressage event at the 1988 Summer Olympics.

References

1971 births
Living people
Colombian female equestrians
Colombian dressage riders
Olympic equestrians of Colombia
Equestrians at the 1988 Summer Olympics
Equestrians at the 1987 Pan American Games
Place of birth missing (living people)
Pan American Games competitors for Colombia
20th-century Colombian women